AC Transit (Alameda-Contra Costa Transit District) is an Oakland-based public transit agency serving the western portions of Alameda and Contra Costa counties in the East Bay of the San Francisco Bay Area. AC Transit also operates "Transbay" routes across San Francisco Bay to San Francisco and selected areas in San Mateo and Santa Clara counties. AC Transit is constituted as a special district under California law. It is governed by seven elected members (five from geographic wards and two at large). It is not a part of or under the control of Alameda or Contra Costa counties or any local jurisdictions.

Buses operate out of four operating divisions: Emeryville, East Oakland (Seminary), Hayward, and Richmond. The Operations Control Center is in Emeryville. The Richmond operating division closed in 2011, but opened again in early 2017 due to a revived economy. The District is the public successor to the privately owned Key System.

Service area
The AC Transit District is the third-largest public bus system in California, serving a number of cities and unincorporated areas in Alameda and Contra Costa counties. These include Alameda, Albany, Ashland, Berkeley, Castro Valley, Cherryland, East Richmond Heights, El Cerrito, El Sobrante, Emeryville, Fairview, Fremont, Hayward, Kensington, Newark, North Richmond, Oakland, Piedmont, Richmond, San Leandro, San Lorenzo, and San Pablo. Some AC Transit bus routes also serve other areas in the Bay Area, such as Contra Costa Centre, Dublin, Milpitas, Palo Alto, Pinole, Pittsburg, San Francisco, Stanford, and Union City.

AC Transit provides service to many colleges and universities, including Berkeley City College, California State University, East Bay, Chabot College, College of Alameda, Contra Costa College, Holy Names University, Laney College, Merritt College, Mills College at Northeastern University, Northwestern Polytechnic University, Ohlone College, Stanford University, and University of California, Berkeley.

Most AC Transit routes connect with rapid transit services, such as BART, with one route connecting to the VTA Orange Line light rail service at the Milpitas Transit Center. Some routes also connect with commuter rail and regional rail services, including the ACE commuter rail service at the Fremont–Centerville station and Amtrak's California Zephyr, Capitol Corridor, Coast Starlight, and San Joaquins services. AC Transit routes also connect with several other bus systems in the Bay Area, such as the Dumbarton Express, Emery Go-Round, FAST, Golden Gate Transit, MUNI, SamTrans, SolTrans, Union City Transit, VTA, and WestCAT bus systems. AC Transit also connects with the San Francisco Bay Ferry system at several ferry slips, including the Alameda Harbor Bay Ferry Slip, the Alameda Seaplane Lagoon Ferry Slip, the Oakland Ferry Slip, and the Richmond Ferry Slip.

While most AC Transit service consists of local lines that operate within the East Bay District, the District also provides Transbay lines. Most of these run across the San Francisco–Oakland Bay Bridge during rush hours only, connecting commuters with San Francisco's Transbay Transit Center. Three routes run across the San Francisco–Oakland Bay Bridge on a daily basis, connecting passengers in Alameda, Berkeley, Emeryville, and Oakland with the Transbay Transit Center. A late night-only bus operates overnight as a Transbay Replacement for BART service when BART is not running, connecting Albany, Berkeley, El Cerrito, Oakland, and Richmond with San Francisco's Central Business District along Market Street, as well as the Inner Mission and SoMa neighborhoods. Several "Early Bird" Transbay Lines run only on early weekday mornings to substitute for early morning BART rail service while BART is undergoing construction, connecting commuters in Contra Costa Centre, Dublin, Fremont, Oakland, Pittsburg, and San Leandro with the Transbay Transit Center. Lastly, one Transbay Bus service is provided during rush hours only across the Dumbarton Bridge between the Fremont BART station and the Stanford Oval at Stanford University, connecting commuters in Fremont with Palo Alto and Stanford.

Hubs
AC Transit's primary hubs include BART stations, major shopping centers, and points of interest, which are spread throughout the East Bay. Most routes serve and/or terminate at BART stations. The hubs include:

 12th St. Oakland City Center BART
 Ashby BART
 Bay Fair BART
 Castro Valley BART
 Chabot College
 Contra Costa College
 Coliseum BART/Amtrak
 Downtown Berkeley BART
 Eastmont Transit Center
 El Cerrito del Norte BART
 El Cerrito Plaza BART
 Fremont BART
 Fruitvale BART
 Hayward BART
 Hillsdale Caltrain Station
 Hilltop Mall

 Lake Merritt BART
 MacArthur BART
 Milpitas BART
 NewPark Mall
 Oakland International Airport
 Richmond BART/Amtrak
 Richmond Parkway Transit Center
 Rockridge BART
 Transbay Transit Center
 San Leandro BART
 South Hayward BART
 Southland Mall
 Union City BART
 Uptown Transit Center (19th Street/Oakland BART)
 Warm Springs/South Fremont BART
 West Oakland BART

Routes

Much of AC transit's ridership is skewed heavily towards a few heavily trafficked local (as opposed to trans-bay) routes.  As of 2013, the top five routes account for a third of all riders, and the top twelve routes account for more than half.

Timeline

Voters created the Alameda-Contra Costa Transit District (AC Transit) in 1956 and subsequently approved a $16.5 million bond issue in 1959 enabling the District to buy out the failing privately owned Key System Transit Lines. In October 1960, AC Transit's service began. The new District built up the bus fleet with 250 new “transit liner” buses, extended service into new neighborhoods, created an intercity express bus network, and increased Bay Bridge bus service.

In 2003, the District introduced a San Mateo-Hayward Bridge route. Designated as Line M, the service connected the BART stations of Castro Valley and Hayward with Foster City and San Mateo's Hillsdale Caltrain station. A second San Mateo-Hayward Bridge route, Line MA, was added in 2006 and discontinued in 2007. (The M replaced the SamTrans 90E, which had been canceled in 1999.)

On June 30, 2003, a new "rapid bus" line operating on San Pablo Avenue was introduced. Designated as Line 72R (or San Pablo Rapid), the service connected Oakland with Richmond and operated at faster speeds than regular local service due to wide stop spacing and signal priority treatments. 

In 2004, the District began service on Line U across the Dumbarton Bridge, connecting Stanford University with ACE and BART trains in Fremont. As part of a consortium of transit agencies (including AC Transit, BART, SamTrans, Union City Transit, and VTA), the District already operated Dumbarton Express bus service across the Dumbarton Bridge.

Beginning December 10, 2005, AC Transit began participating in the regional All Nighter network, providing 24-hour bus service throughout its service area to supplement BART service, which does not operate during owl hours. AC Transit had provided 24-hour service on many of its trunk lines prior to this date, except in the late 1990s due to budget limitations.

On July 30, 2007, AC Transit announced that it had entered into a 25-year partnership with SunPower, MMA Renewable Ventures, and PG&E to install solar energy systems at its facilities in an effort to reduce its carbon footprint, improve local air quality, and save money on energy costs that could be used instead to spend on transit service.

On March 28, 2010, several major service changes were implemented to reduce a severe budget shortfall. Changes included reduced service on local and Transbay lines, elimination of unproductive routes, splitting of the 51 into two sections (called as lines "51A" and "51B"), and the introduction of limited-stop line 58L (which, as of 2016, is discontinued).

Starting in February 2011, all buses on Line 376 were being escorted by a marked Contra Costa County Sheriff's patrol vehicle through the unincorporated community of North Richmond. Line 376 provides late-night service through North Richmond and the nearby cities of Richmond, San Pablo, and Pinole. The escorts were introduced to improve the safety of the service, which had five serious incidents between 5 January and 9 February.

On December 13, 2013, AC Transit adopted a new fare policy that brought changes to the transit system July 2014, including a new day pass that is in line with other transit agencies including VTA and SamTrans. The policy is also designed to speed boarding and help keep buses on schedule, provide greater convenience and value for customers, and encourage more customers to switch to Clipper

Rapid Bus and Bus Rapid Transit

A rapid bus line was introduced on San Pablo Avenue on June 30, 2003. Designated as Line 72R (or San Pablo Rapid), it operates from 6 am to 7 pm at 12-minute intervals on weekdays, and 7 am to 7 pm at 15-minute intervals on weekends and holidays. Bus stops are spaced 2/3-mile apart on average, running between Jack London Square (via 20th Street and Broadway) in Oakland and Contra Costa College in San Pablo, and buses receive signal priority at several intersections. Although the line does have scheduled timepoints en route, most buses typically travel along the route as fast (or as slow) as traffic allows.

On June 24, 2007, the success of line 72R made it a model for another rapid bus line that was introduced. Line 1R (or International Rapid) operated on weekdays between Berkeley Way and Oxford Street in Berkeley and Bay Fair BART station in San Leandro, mainly along Telegraph Avenue, International Boulevard, and East 14th Street. Weekend and holiday service operated between Downtown Oakland and San Leandro only.

Line 1R was discontinued on June 26, 2016. On August 9, 2020, the 1R was largely replaced by Tempo, AC Transit's new Bus Rapid Transit (BRT) route. Tempo operates between the Uptown Transit Center and the San Leandro BART station via International Boulevard and East 14th Street. It features 46 brand new platform stations (curbside and center-median) with dedicated bus lanes along the majority of the route. The Telegraph Avenue alignment of the 1R between the Uptown Transit Center and U.C. Berkeley is currently being served by local route 6.

Bus fleet

At its inception, AC Transit purchased the mixed White, Mack, and GM "old-look" bus fleet from its predecessor, the Key System. The ex-Key System buses were repainted in "clownface" livery, featuring a predominantly white (upper half) and orange (lower front) color scheme with teal side stripes, and AC Transit adopted a "wing" logo featuring the same colors. After its inception, the first new AC Transit orders were for GM New Look buses, which the agency advertised as "Transit Liners". AC Transit began New Look operation in late 1960. AC Transit would continue to operate a mixed fleet of buses throughout the 1960s.

AC Transit also pioneered the use of articulated buses in the United States; in March 1966 it was the first transit agency to use the Super Golden Eagle long-distance coach (originally designed and built for Continental Trailways; AC Transit designated it XMC-77 and called it the "Freeway Train"), primarily on Transbay service. By 1970, AC Transit was one of six agencies to participate in a "super bus project" coordinated by the National Transportation Center (Pittsburgh) to write a specification for a higher-capacity bus; once the specification had been written, two prototypes would be built and tested to select a winner for a large group procurement of 100 buses to keep per-unit costs low. Riders received the M.A.N. bus favorably, and the specification was released for bid in 1975; AC Transit placed an order for 30 buses in 1976 and deliveries began from the AM General/M.A.N. joint venture in 1978.

For its rigid buses, AC Transit continued purchasing GM New Look buses through the early 1970s, then switched to purchasing Flxible New Look buses starting in 1974. Since the early 1980s, AC Transit began acquiring buses from Flyer, Neoplan, and Gillig. Around this time, AC Transit began ordering new buses in a "stripe" color scheme, featuring the same orange, teal, and white colors as the previous "clownface" livery. In the late 1990s, AC Transit added buses from NABI. AC Transit supplemented these buses with a fleet of 45-foot over-the-road coaches purchased from Motor Coach Industries beginning in the early 2000s.

In 2003, AC Transit began purchasing low-floor buses from Van Hool. The Van Hool buses were assembled in Belgium and featured low floors and three doors (four doors on articulated models), which AC Transit touted as the key to bus rapid transit service between Berkeley and San Leandro along Shattuck, Telegraph, International Blvd, and East 14th Street. At the same time, AC Transit rolled out a revised "ribbon" livery featuring new colors (green and black), and a new logo. The logo was simplified in 2014.

After criticism over the use of federal funds to purchase foreign-made Van Hool buses and the tailoring of specification requirements to exclude domestic manufacturers, AC Transit ordered locally-built Gillig buses in 2012. In March 2013, AC Transit began operating the first of its new Gillig buses. In August of the same year, AC Transit placed the first of its new New Flyer Xcelsior articulated buses into service. Later that year, in November 2013, new Gillig buses with a suburban seating configuration and Transbay branding were introduced into service.

All AC Transit buses are wheelchair accessible and have front-mounted bicycle racks. The MCI buses also feature luggage bay bicycle racks. AC Transit buses purchased after 2007 have air conditioning, as approved by the Board of Directors.

Alternative power

In 1969, AC Transit received a grant and converted bus #666 to steam power, which ran in revenue service between 1971 and 1972. The propulsion system was designed by William Brobeck and used a triple-expansion reciprocating steam engine; power was improved compared to the original six-cylinder Detroit Diesel 6V71 engine and emissions were reduced, but fuel consumption was higher than the conventional diesel bus. The steam system is a closed loop. Exhaust steam is condensed and returned to the steam generator, which is an externally-fired boiler that uses  of coiled steel tubing. Prior to entering service, the steam bus was exhibited in Washington DC and to the public. Bus #666 completed  in revenue service when the trial ended in September 1972, and the diesel engine was subsequently reinstalled in the bus.

AC Transit is the lead agency of Zero Emission Bay Area (ZEBA), a consortium of five Bay Area transit agencies (AC Transit, Golden Gate Transit, SFMTA, SamTrans, and VTA) demonstrating fuel cell buses. The District began the HyRoad program in 1999 and tested several fuel cell buses with new hydrogen fuelling infrastructure, including the Ballard/XCELLSiS ZEbus (a New Flyer F40LF with a Ballard fuel cell) in November 1999. Three hydrogen-powered buses, based on the Van Hool A330, operated in revenue service from 2006 to 2010. AC Transit took delivery of 12 additional third-generation fuel cell buses, based on the Van Hool A300L in 2011. In 2019, AC Transit began operating 11 additional hydrogen fuel cell buses from New Flyer, one of which is a 60-foot articulated bus, and 5 battery electric buses from New Flyer.

Funding
AC Transit is funded with a mix of federal, state, and local government subsidies, as well as passenger fares.

In March 2004, voters throughout the San Francisco Bay Area approved Regional Measure 2, which funds regional transportation capital and operating programs through a US$1.00 surcharge on State-owned bridges operated by the BATA. (The Golden Gate Bridge is owned and operated by the Golden Gate Bridge, Highway and Transportation District.)

In November 2004, voters approved Measure BB, which increased the parcel tax from US$24 to US$48 annually for 10 years beginning 1 July 2005, to help fund AC Transit services.

In April 2005, a federal class-action lawsuit was filed against the Metropolitan Transportation Commission alleging that it discriminates against AC Transit's primarily minority riders by giving AC Transit disproportionately less money than BART and Caltrain. AC Transit is not party to the lawsuit, and the court sided with MTC in 2009.

In November 2008, voters approved Measure VV, which increased the parcel tax by US$48 annually for 10 years beginning 1 July 2009, to help fund AC Transit services. Measure VV also extended the US$48 parcel tax approved under Measure BB so a total US$96 annual tax is effective through 30 June 2019.

Internet access
AC Transit also offers wireless internet on many buses that serve Transbay lines. These buses can be distinguished by their all-green livery, padded "commuter" seats, and Wi-Fi logos near the front entrance door and inside the bus.

References

External links

 
 AC Transit mobile website

Public transportation in San Francisco
Public transportation in San Mateo County, California
Public transportation in Santa Clara County, California
Public transportation in Alameda County, California
Public transportation in Contra Costa County, California
Transportation in Oakland, California
Bus transportation in California
Transit agencies in California